Zorita de los Canes is a municipality located in the province of Guadalajara, Castile-La Mancha, Spain. According to the 2004 census (INE), the municipality has a population of 98 inhabitants. There is a castle located in the municipality.

The castle was given to Alfonso VIII in 1174 and was in the possession of the Dukes of Pastrana until 1723, when ownership was given to the Counts of San Rafael.

References

Web of Zorita de los Canes

Municipalities in the Province of Guadalajara